Nate Garrelts is an American academic who studies digital games and other media. He has edited four collections of essays on digital games: Digital Gameplay (McFarland, 2005), The Meaning and Culture of Grand Theft Auto (McFarland, 2006), Understanding Minecraft (McFarland, 2014), and Responding to Call of Duty (McFarland, 2017).The Meaning and Culture of Grand Theft Auto was the first academic collection to focus on a single game series. He has also contributed essays to the websites Bad Subjects and Berfrois. In 2003, he founded the Video Game Studies area at the Popular Culture Association/ American Culture Association National Conference in New Orleans and continued to coordinate it until 2007. This area, which has since been renamed Game Studies, is one of the longest continually run game studies events in the United States.

Biography
Garrelts received his PhD in American Studies from Michigan State University (2003). His dissertation was titled The Official Strategy Guide for Video Game Studies: A Grammar and Rhetoric. He is currently Professor of English at Ferris State University.

Published works

References

External links
 McFarland Books

American mass media scholars
Living people
Ferris State University faculty
Year of birth missing (living people)
Video game researchers
Digital media educators